Otradnoye is a rural locality (a selo) in Buturlinovka Urban Settlement, Buturlinovsky District, Voronezh Oblast, Russia. The population was 63 as of 2010. There are 3 streets.

Geography 
Otradnoye is located 6 km north of Buturlinovka (the district's administrative centre) by road. Krugly is the nearest rural locality.

References 

Rural localities in Buturlinovsky District